Belvisia may refer to:
 Belvisia, a genus of flowering plants in the family Lecythidaceae, synonym of Napoleonaea
 Belvisia, a genus of ferns in the family Polypodiaceae, synonym of Lepisorus